Eric Anthony Page (born September 23, 1991) is an American football wide receiver and punt returner who is currently a free agent. He played college football for the University of Toledo, and received consensus All-American honors.  The Denver Broncos signed him as an undrafted free agent following the 2012 NFL Draft.

College career
Page attended the University of Toledo, where he played for the Toledo Rockets football team from 2009 to 2011. As a freshman in 2009, he was voted to the freshman All-American team by College Football News. As a sophomore in 2010, he was a consensus first-team All-American. As a junior in 2011, he caught 112 passes in the regular season, becoming Toledo's all-time leading receiver, and he was named to the All-MAC first-team at three positions: as a wide receiver, as a kick returner, and as a punt returner. Following the 2011 season, he forwent his fourth year of collegiate eligibility and entered the 2012 NFL draft.

Professional career

Denver Broncos
After the closure of the third day in the 2012 NFL Draft, Page was left undrafted and he signed with the Denver Broncos for an undisclosed amount.  The Broncos released him on July 25, 2012, after he tore his anterior cruciate ligament in practice.

Tampa Bay Buccaneers
On April 11, 2013, Page was signed by the Buccaneers. He started all 16 games at the punt and kick return spot. The Buccaneers waived him on August 24, 2014. He was signed to the practice squad that October 8 and released again on October 27.

Edmonton Eskimos
Page signed with the Eskimos on February 13, 2015. He was released on June 14, following the first preseason game.

References

External links
 Tampa Bay Buccaneers bio
 Toledo Rockets bio
 Edmonton Eskimos bio

1991 births
Living people
All-American college football players
American football return specialists
American football wide receivers
Edmonton Elks players
Sportspeople from Toledo, Ohio
Toledo Rockets football players
Tampa Bay Buccaneers players